Guri Shin clan is one of the Korean clans. Their Bon-gwan was in Guri, Gyeonggi Province. Their founder is Valeri Sarychev, a soccer player and instructor. He was a Russian-Korean from Tajik Soviet Socialist Republic which was one of the republics in the Soviet Union. He acquired Korean citizenship in the year 2000.

See also 
 Korean clan names of foreign origin

References

External links 
 

Sin clans
Korean people of Russian descent